Duke of Magenta (1875–1899)  was one of the most successful racehorses in the United States in the 19th century.

Background
Foaled in 1875 at the Woodburn Stud near Lexington, Kentucky, he was owned by New York City tobacco tycoon George L. Lorillard and trained by Hall of Famer R. Wyndham Walden. Duke of Magenta was one of the last sons of the Thoroughbred sire Lexington.

Racing career
In 1878, Duke of Magenta won the Preakness Stakes, the Withers Stakes, the Belmont Stakes, and the Travers Stakes, a feat accomplished since by only two other colts: Man o' War and Native Dancer. Excluding the Withers, he is also one of only seven horses to have won the Preakness, Belmont, and Travers.

In Duke of Magenta's day, the Derby was a recently established race not yet considered important by East Coast breeders. Duke of Magenta died on September 20, 1899, at the farm of J. McCloud in Brookline, Massachusetts.

Honors
In 2011, Duke of Magenta was inducted into the National Museum of Racing and Hall of Fame.

Pedigree

Sire line tree

Duke of Magenta
Young Duke
Leo
Duke of Kent
Eric

References

1875 racehorse births
1899 racehorse deaths
Racehorses bred in Kentucky
Belmont Stakes winners
Preakness Stakes winners
United States Thoroughbred Racing Hall of Fame inductees
Thoroughbred family A11
Byerley Turk sire line